The Euscorpiidae are a family of scorpions.

Genera
Euscorpiidae contains the following six genera:

 Alpiscorpius Gantenbein et al., 1999
 Euscorpius Thorell, 1876
 Megacormus Karsch, 1881
 Plesiochactas Pocock, 1900
 Tetratrichobothrius Birula, 1917
 Troglocormus Francke, 1981

References

 </ref>
 
 

 
Scorpion families